Scum of the Earth Church (SOTEC or Scum) is a non-denominational Christian urban church located in Denver, Colorado's arts district, in that city's Lincoln Park neighborhood. Its name is taken from 1 Corinthians 4:11-13, which includes Paul the Apostle's statement, "We have become the scum of the earth." , the Denver church was led by pastor Mike Sares.

SOTEC's founding aim was to create a ministry to young individuals who perceived themselves as outcasts, and therefore might not feel welcome at traditional Christian churches, individuals including goths, the pierced and tattooed crowd, punk rockers, and skateboarders, and it has attracted these, as well as the poor and homeless, ravers, and urban artists (and diverse other groups including students and academics, and immigrant and blue-collar families). Currently, the vision of Scum of the Earth is to be an outpost on the perimeter of God's kingdom seeking redemption in Jesus Christ. SOTEC uses a wide array of methods and activities to communicate its message, including bible study groups and podcasts, ministry programs to meet material and relational needs of congregants (food, shelter, guidance), artistic expressions that include exhibitions of art and poetry, as well as various other classes, groups, and activities.

Its pastors and others have described SOTEC as being evangelical in its theology, perspectives, and approach to ministry, and the church is a member of an association in the United States, the Alliance for Renewal Churches. Its impact extends beyond its local church ministries, in that its name and focus have drawn wide attention, leading to its being a point of discussion in relation to the Emerging Church movement, and in other venues discussing modern Christian ministry to young people and in urban settings.

Denver
Leaders of record are:
 Mike Sares, founding pastor, 2000– . , still in leadership. Ordained through the Alliance for Renewal.
 Jesse Heilmann, senior pastor
 Fran Blomberg, senior pastor

Seattle
This sister church is variously described as having been founded by Denver pastors Mike Sares and Reese Roper, or by John Swanger. Leaders of record are:
 John Swanger, 2003–2009. Described as founding pastor with 6-year tenure by Zach McCauley in 2012. Status of ordination unknown.
 Zach McCauley, 2009– . , still in leadership. Status of ordination unknown.

This sister church officially closed its doors in 2015.

Description

Scum of the Earth Church, also known as SOTEC, or simply Scum, is an urban church located Denver's arts district and is described as a local Christian church unaffiliated with a denomination, although it is a member of a church association in the United States, the Alliance for Renewal Churches. SOTEC's pastors and others have described SOTEC as being evangelical in its theology, perspectives, and approach to ministry. The parent church is located as of this date, in the Lincoln Park neighborhood of Denver, Colorado.

In 2006, Bob Whitesel, in preparation to write Inside the Organic Church,  described his "first encounter" with the church as seeing a "parking lot was filled with urban youth playing basketball, skateboarding, smoking, or just hanging out. And while I have visited organic churches across North America and England, the congregation assembled here was one of the edgiest. He goes on to describe SOTEC's congregants ("audience") as being the Rather than on the broader of these demographic descriptions, the church, at its founding, indicated concern for specific disenfranchised groups, e.g., skateboarders, goths and others with piercings and tattoos, and punk rockers. In 2007, SOTEC was described by Sean Cronin and Naomi Zeveloff of Westword, who noted that most present at their visit were individuals in their 20s, most with piercings and tattoos, further reiterating the church's draw of the homeless, and of "punks, ravers ... people who might otherwise feel isolated from typical Sunday morning services." These observations were echoed by English observers from The Economist, John Micklethwait and Adrian Woolridge, whose 2009 catalogings included "homeless people, punks, skaters, and ravers" and "bikers, gays and dropouts."

The church's pastor, Mike Sares, was quoted by CBSs Lee Cowan and John Kreiser in 2006 as saying that SOTEC had looked "to build a place where folks who didn't fit in other church settings would actually feel welcome"; the CBS report continued that "Scum of the Earth uses many tools to accomplish that goal, including podcasts ... creative writing ... cooking and sewing classes, comic book ... and bible study groups, [and] exhibitions of poetry and art by church members ..." Sares is noted as saying that the message is not new, though the approach is: "It's just church ... It's not nearly as radical as you think it is—I mean there's no moshing during worship."

Westwords Cronin and Zeveloff go on to describe SOTEC service content:  
concluding that SOTEC was "no frills" but "not radical either," "not a free for all, [and] not a fundamental redefinition of what Christianity should look like"; they conclude their piece, writing that at SOTEC, "tattoos and piercings do not a liberal make" and that "joy of Scum" was that it allowed individuals to pursue their faith regardless of appearance, or place of residence.

The church has been described as "emergent" or placed within the movement of "Emergent Church[es]" by those reporting on it, and by Brian D. McLaren, a former English professor and contributor to "The Church in Emerging Culture: Five Perspectives" (2003).

History 

Scum of the Earth Church was founded by Mike Sares and Reese Roper in February 2000. It is described as growing out of a Bible study led by Sares, who was a pastor associated with a Presbyterian church in Denver (Corona Presbyterian Church), and prompted by his forced resignation after departure of the church's senior pastor. The Bible study moved its meetings into the home of Sares, after he left his pastoring job. In Sares recollection, as related to David Yonke of Sare's hometown Toledo Blade, Sares and Reese Roper of the band Five Iron Frenzy then "decided to stop talking about such a church and go ahead and start one." Sares recalls that the first meetings of the church were held at a coffee shop called the Prodigal, which served as a "drop-in center for homeless ... kids" during the work week.

The name of the church is much reported and commented upon. The name is taken from 1 Corinthians 4:11-13 (as it appears in particular translations, e.g., the New International Version, NIV): As described by Mike Sares to Bob Whitesel,  It has elsewhere been reported that Sares initially expressed concern over possible controversy that could result from the name, but that he ultimately agreed with the group.

After overcrowding became an issue, the church was given space in the Tollgate Coffee House in 2001. Continued growth and tenant issues lead the church to move to its third location at a now-demolished building; in August 2007, the congregation found itself meeting in the building belonging to the Church in the City "just off of East Colfax" (on the corner of Colfax and Josephine in downtown Denver). Then, in September 2008, the church purchased, 
at 935 W. 11th Avenue in Denver, a building that is "tucked behind a 7-Eleven and a liquor store." Despite a considerable sum having been spent by former owner Hanzon on renovations, the building was found in violation of several fire codes by the Denver Fire Department in July 2010, and SOTEC was forced to decamp, and hold services and other activities at His Love Fellowship Church, two blocks away. On December 18, 2011, the congregation was able to return to their building.

, the Denver church was led by pastor Mike Sares.

Seattle sister church 

A sister church, Scum of the Earth Church Seattle, is located in Seattle, Washington. As told by Zach McCauley to Hayat Norimine of The Daily in 2012, John Swanger, a member of the Denver church, moved to Seattle in 2003 "when he felt he had been called to the Northwest by God." After an experience with another Christian church, where he describes himself as having been "kicked out because he wore earrings," he founded the "Seattle Scum church." As described by McCauley, to whom Swanger "passed the torch" of church leadership at the Seattle church, six years later (and as of 2012 is the current pastor), Elsewhere, the church is reported as having been co-founded by Denver pastor Mike Sares and Reese Roper. The Swangers have subsequently moved back to Denver.

Teaching and programs

A variety of past and ongoing programs characterise SOTEC's approach to local church function in the context of the groups that it aims to serve. In 2006, Mike Sares described the methods of communicating the church's spoken message to include bible study groups and podcasts (e.g., which include a wide selection at iTunes); its artistic expressions to include exhibitions of congregant poetry and art, classes on creative writing, and a photographic gallery of its activities; and various other activities including a comic book club, and cooking and sewing classes.

The church has had a wide variety of visiting teachers over the years, the list of whom includes:

 Jay Bakker, of Revolution Church;
 Randy Stonehill, a Christian music recording artist;
 Trevor Bron, former pastor of The Next Level (TNL) church;
 Craig Blomberg, a Denver Seminary professor;
 Douglas Groothuis, a Denver Seminary professor;
 Bob Beltz, of Walden Media; and 
 Margaret Feinberg, and author and speaker.

Notable congregants

A number of individuals attending the Denver congregation have been newsmakers in their respective fields. Band members of Five Iron Frenzy, a band described both as "punk" and "Christian" has a long association with SOTEC, with Reese Roper being mentioned as a co-founder of the Denver location, and participants there including that band's saxophonist, Leanor "Jeff the Girl" Ortega Till. Artist Naomi Haverland, a representational artist who works in large scale     acrylic, oil, and chalk images, was also a self-described part of the congregation, as of April 2014.

Impact

In addition to its local impact, and its expansion into a network of churches, SOTEC has inspired the founding of other congregations related in style and temperament, for instance The Refuse of Colorado Springs, Colorado, that uses the same biblical verse as its theme, and which was led by Dave Weatherby as of August 2006.

In 2006, Scott Bader-Saye, writing in a special issue on "The Emerging Church"" for the International Journal for the Study of the Christian Church argued that the seeming radical aspects of SOTEC, and the "innovation" involved in its appeal to fringe elements of society (in this century), were "not fundamentally different from traditional evangelicalism."

Bill Bishop, an Austin American-Statesman reporter, presented a political science effort on the demographics of the political and cultural divisions in America, published as The Big Sort: Why the Clustering of Like-Minded America Is Tearing Us Apart. In it he refers to SOTEC as one of several churches comparable to one on which Bishop focused on in his study—Bluers, in Minneapolis, Minnesota—and to this set as distinctive from mega-churches that characterize the detrimental "Balkanization" and clustering of viewpoints, his central thesis.

John Micklethwait and Adiran Woolridge, respectively, the editor in chief and Washington bureau chief of The Economist, take note of SOTEC in their book God is Back: How the Global Revival of Faith is Changing the World (2009), and in comments related to that book use it as a case in point for a broad conclusion: "The real strength of religious America lies in its diversity. There are more than 200 religious traditions in America, with 20 different sorts of Baptists alone. Religious America is remarkably good at segmenting its customer base: There are services for bikers, gays and dropouts (the Scum of the Earth Church in Denver)."

Critiques

Paleoconservative political commentator Pat Buchanan, writing in Suicide of a Superpower: Will America Survive to 2025? (2011), in contrast to the earlier Micklethwait and Woolridge argument, mentions SOTEC and questions the tailoring of services to specific populations, asking, "Is this a manifestation of the 'real strength' of Christianity, or does it instead, sound like disintegration, the loss of the unity of the People of God?", a query he does not develop further, instead turning to a broad challenge to denominationalism and American church-attendance criteria. However, Buchanan also notes: "... [I]t sometimes seems that ... Christians preach a gospel of the First Church of Christ, Capitalist. Yet, ... the life and death of Christ and is apostles ... [do] not appear any were successful by the standards of the world ..." The above-cited fragment can be understood as suggesting agreement, rather than disagreement, with SOTEC principles.

References

Further reading 

 
 
 
 
 
  [see subtitle "Scum of the Earth"]
 
 
 
 
 
  The opening of the article also appears at the authors personal blogsite, On Faith and Culture, here.
 
  This article is available as article (appended string) "l83dS#selection-317.0-329.21", at the site "archive.today/", access date April 19, 2016.
 
 
 
 
 
 

Churches in Denver
Churches in Seattle
Christian organizations established in 2000
Non-denominational Evangelical churches
Emerging church movement
2000 establishments in Colorado